Ken Doherty (born 17 September 1969) is an Irish professional snooker player, commentator and radio presenter.

As an amateur, Doherty won the Irish Amateur Championship twice, the World Under-21 Amateur Championship and the World Amateur Championship. Since turning professional in 1990, he has won six ranking tournaments, including the 1997 World Snooker Championship in which he defeated Stephen Hendry, inflicting Hendry's first loss in a world final. Doherty came very close to breaking the Crucible curse, reaching the 1998 final where he lost out to John Higgins. He reached a third final in 2003, in which he was defeated by Mark Williams. In other triple crown events, he has been runner-up three times in the UK Championship and twice in the Masters.

Doherty has compiled more than 350 century breaks in professional competition. Since 2009, he has combined his playing career with commentating and punditry work.

Career
Doherty appeared in two quarter-finals in his first season as a professional, at the 1991 Classic and the 1991 Irish Masters, being beaten 5–3 by Jimmy White on both occasions. In the following snooker year, he won the qualifying event for the 1992 Masters, though there he lost 1–5 to John Parrott in the first round. He also made it to the semi-finals of the 1992 British and Strachan Open, and reached the final of the 1992 Irish Masters. He was a finalist at the 1992 Grand Prix as well, narrowly losing 10–9 to Jimmy White. In the same event a year later, Doherty lost in the final again, this time 6–9 to Peter Ebdon.

Doherty's first ranking title was the 1993 Welsh Open, enough to take him into the top 16 in the world, where he remained until the 2007–08 season. He also won the 1993 Irish Professional Championship, was a semi-finalist at the 1993 International Open, and a quarter-finalist again at the 1993 Irish Masters. More quarter-final appearances followed at the 1994 Masters and the 1994 World Championship, his only run past the second round in the latter before 1997, and later on in the 1994 Dubai Classic, repeating his result from the previous edition of the event, down to the scoreline as he was beaten 5–4 both times. These weren't his only replicated outcomes, he also won the 1994 Pontins Professional just like he did last year, as well as the 1994 Scottish Masters after winning it in 1993 too. In November he made it to the final of the 1994 UK Championship, which he lost 5–10 to Stephen Hendry, then in December he reached the quarter-final stage of the 1994 European Open, where he was defeated 5–3 by Nigel Bond. In the second half of the season he was in yet another quarter-final at the 1995 Irish Masters, and in two finals, at the 1995 Pontins Professional and the 1995 European League.

Doherty became only the third player from outside the United Kingdom (after Australian Horace Lindrum in 1952 and Canadian Cliff Thorburn in 1980) to win the World Championship when he beat Stephen Hendry 18–12 in the 1997 final, at the age of 27. He also reached the World Championship final in 1998, losing to John Higgins, and in 2003, losing narrowly to Mark Williams. The latter run was noted for some outstanding comebacks, including final-frame wins over Graeme Dott and Shaun Murphy, a 13–8 win over Higgins in a match where Doherty raced ahead 10–0 but Higgins fought back to 10–7, and a semi-final fightback from 9–15 to beat Paul Hunter 17–16. In that championship, Doherty played more frames than anyone before or since. In the final, Williams led 11–4, but Doherty fought back to 12–12 and 16–16. In frame 33, Doherty missed the penultimate red with a clearance easily available. Williams won that crucial frame and the next to prevail 18–16.

Doherty narrowly failed to achieve a maximum break when he missed a routine final black off its spot in the 15th frame of the 2000 Benson & Hedges Masters final against Matthew Stevens, a match Doherty eventually lost 10–8. This one pot would have seen him win an £80,000 sports car. However, his 140 break at least brought him the consolation of the £19,000 highest break prize. He did make a 147 break two years later though, when he won the Cue Club Pro-Am tournament in Killarney in 2002. He made light of his prize on television shortly afterwards, which was allegedly €300, a BMX bicycle and a toy Ferrari car. His first official maximum was compiled in 2012, during a first round win against Julian Treiber at the Paul Hunter Classic.

In 2001 Doherty became one of the few players who have won back-to-back ranking events, as he won the Welsh Open and the Thailand Masters, while also reaching the final of the next tournament, the Regal Scottish Open.

In the 2005 World Championship, Doherty beat Barry Pinches in the first round 10–5, winning the last 8 frames, but was knocked out in the second round by Alan McManus 13–11.

Following an average start to the 2005–06 season, Doherty won the Malta Cup in February 2006, beating John Higgins in the final. Doherty had trailed 8–5 at one stage but managed a stirring comeback, winning four frames in a row. He called the victory, which bridged a five-year gap, his "most important tournament win since the World Championship".

Doherty started brightly in the 2006 World Championship, winning his first match by defeating Barry Hawkins 10–1, then he beat Matthew Stevens 13–8, playing superbly to win the last five frames. He was favourite in his quarter-final match against Marco Fu but lost 13–10. It was 8–8 as the final session started, but Doherty struggled despite winning a frame in which he required three snookers. Although he led 7–6, 8–7, 9–8 and 10–9, he could never quite take decisive advantage to win the match. Doherty admitted afterwards that he "blew it" but that he still had "a couple more years" to come back and win the title. He ended the 2005–06 season as the world number 2, his highest ranking ever.

He made a solid start to the 2006–07 season by reaching the quarter-final at what is the closest thing to a home tournament for him, the Northern Ireland Trophy at Belfast's Waterfront Hall. He followed this up with a last-16 defeat at the Grand Prix in Aberdeen and the UK Championship in York. He reached the quarter-finals of the next two tournaments, the Masters and the Malta Cup. He lost in the first round of the World Championship and, although clearly disappointed, the Dubliner vowed to continue. He was provisional world number 1 for most of 2006–07, but finished the season as 4th in the rankings.

In October 2006, he won the invitational Irish Professional Championship for a second time, having previously captured the title in 1993. He beat Michael Judge 9–4 in the final. A year later he defended his title with a resounding 9–2 victory over Fergal O'Brien. He followed this up a week later by becoming the first Irishman to win the Pot Black invitational tournament, beating Shaun Murphy 76–31 in the one-frame final.

Doherty did not start the 2007–08 season well, winning only one match during the first four ranking tournaments. However, he did reach the semi-finals of the Masters with victories over Mark Williams and Shaun Murphy, before losing to eventual champion Mark Selby. He then reached the final of the Malta Cup for a record fifth time, defeating John Higgins in the semi-finals, before losing to Murphy in the final. Unfortunately for Doherty, neither of these events are ranking events, meaning his performances did nothing to keep him in the top rankings for the 2008–09 season. Defeat to Liang Wenbo in the first round of the World Championship ensured that he dropped out of the top 16 after 15 years, and he started the new season 32nd on the provisional one-year list. A run of qualifying defeats saw him drop as low as 38th before the UK Championship.

Doherty's poor run of form continued during the 2008–09 season during which he won only two matches. For the first time since 1993, he failed to qualify for the World Championship, having been beaten in the final qualifying round by Gerard Greene.

Doherty's form saw an upturn in the 2009–10 season, with a rise back into the top 32 in the rankings, up from 44th to 30th; this was due to a quarter-final appearance in the 2009 Shanghai Masters, and a last-16 appearance in the 2009 Grand Prix. Doherty defeated six-time World Championship finalist Jimmy White 10–3, and two-time Crucible semi-finalist Joe Swail 10–1 to mark his return to the World Championship for the first time since 2008. In an amusing moment, Doherty got down on his knees and kissed the carpet upon his return to the venue. However, he lost his first-round match 10–4 to reigning Masters champion Mark Selby.

The 2010–11 season proved to be a mixed campaign for Doherty, who made it to the last 32 of the 2010 World Open, yet missed out on qualifying for the 2011 German Masters, the 2011 Welsh Open and crucially, blowing a 6–3 lead, losing 10–6 to Jimmy Robertson in the final stage of qualifying for the 2011 World Championship, meaning he had only reached the Crucible once out of his previous three attempts.

Doherty had an excellent start to the 2011–12 season as he qualified for the Australian Goldfields Open, where he reached his first ranking event semi-final since 2006. He beat Mark Selby 5–3 in the quarter-finals, sealing the match with a clearance which he described as the best of his career. Doherty also stated that he almost quit the game in 2009, following his downturn in form which saw him drop to world number 55. He failed to replicate his form in the semi-finals, however, as he was beaten 2–6 by Mark Williams. In the remainder of the season Doherty qualified for the German Masters and the Welsh Open, but was defeated in the first round by Williams and Mark Allen respectively, without picking up a frame. He also reached the final of the non-ranking Irish Classic, losing 2–5 to Fergal O'Brien.

He was ranked 32nd in the world going into the 2012 World Championship qualifiers, where he faced Anthony Hamilton. The match went into a deciding frame with Doherty 40 points behind, but he profited from a Hamilton error to produce a match-winning clearance to win 10–9, and earned a first-round match against Neil Robertson. He lost 4–10, and finished the season ranked world number 35.

Doherty began the 2012–13 season by losing 4–5 to Stuart Bingham in the second round of the Wuxi Classic, and 3–5 to Martin Gould in the first round of the Australian Goldfields Open. He went on to reach the quarter-finals of the event, losing 0–4 to Mark Selby. Doherty was defeated in qualifying for the Shanghai Masters and the 2012 UK Championship, and failed to advance beyond the wildcard round of the International Championship. At the fifth European Tour Event, the Scottish Open, he saw off the likes of Luca Brecel and Ryan Day to reach the semi-finals where he lost 2–4 to Ding Junhui. Doherty was eliminated in the first round of the German Masters by Peter Lines, but then had his best run of the season at the Welsh Open. He beat four-time world champion John Higgins 4–1 and Tom Ford 4–3 to make it through to the quarter-finals. He led Stuart Bingham 2–0, but a series of missed pots saw Doherty lose his confidence and he went on to lose 3–5. His aforementioned run to the semi-finals of the Scottish Open helped him finish 16th on the PTC Order of Merit to qualify as one of the top 26 players for the Finals, but he lost 2–4 to Kurt Maflin in the first round. Doherty almost pulled off one of his trademark comebacks against Matthew Selt in the final round of the World Championship qualifying, as from 4–9 down he levelled at 9–9, but he lost the deciding frame. The result meant that this was the first season where Doherty had not featured in any of snooker's Triple Crown events. Doherty increased his ranking by eight spots during the season to finish it ranked world number 27.

Doherty qualified for all but two of the ranking events in the 2013–14 season, but couldn't advance beyond the second round in any of them. In April, he qualified for the World Championship after a 10–5 win against Dechawat Poomjaeng in the final qualifying round. Doherty was the oldest player in the draw in his 19th Crucible appearance, and after trailing Stuart Bingham 5–4 in the opening session of their first round match, Doherty produced his best snooker to take all six frames in the next session and win a match at the Crucible for the first time since 2006. He then lost 13–8 to Alan McManus, the second oldest player in the event.

Doherty won three qualifying matches and a wildcard round to be at the 2014 Shanghai Masters, where he met Mark Selby in the first round, losing 5–2. The only other tournament Doherty could advance to the last 32 in this season was the 2014 UK Championship by overcoming Mitchell Mann and Michael White, but he was beaten 6–1 by Ricky Walden. He was knocked out of the semi-finals of the World Seniors Championship by Fergal O'Brien. He reached the final round of World Championship qualifying following wins over Reanne Evans and Lee Walker, but was thrashed 10–3 by Mark Davis. Doherty was placed 45th in the world rankings at the end of the season, the lowest he had been since 1991.

A 6–0 thrashing at the hands of Peter Ebdon ended Doherty's International Championship run at the first round stage, and he lost 6–3 to Mark Davis in the second round of the 2015 UK Championship, having whitewashed Tony Drago 6–0 in the opener. His best results in the season were a pair of last 32 exits at the German Masters and Welsh Open, losing 5–1 to Stephen Maguire and 4–2 to Joe Perry respectively. His end of season ranking of 57 was the lowest of his 26-year professional career. He had two last 16 showings during 2016–17, and would have dropped off the tour at the end of the season as he was outside of the top 64 in the world rankings. However, the day before the 2017 World Championship started, it was announced that Doherty would receive an invitational tour card for the next two years.

Doherty played against Ronnie O'Sullivan, the defending champion, in the second round of the 2018 UK Championship. Doherty was sharp throughout the first half of the first session, leading 3–1, then he extended his lead further to 4–1, but O'Sullivan fought back to win the next 4 frames. Doherty was able to force a decider, but ultimately just one error from him was enough for his opponent to finish the frame, to prevent Doherty from causing a considerable upset in the tournament where many seeds fell to lower-ranked players already, and more would follow. Doherty would be the only player that came close to defeating the eventual champion, as the other matches, with the exception of the final, produced very one-sided results.

Doherty's loss in the 2020 World Championship qualifying meant that he finished the season outside the top 64 and fell out of the tour. However, he was given an invitational tour card to continue playing professional snooker in the 2020–21 and 2021–22 seasons. The same occurred at his loss in the 2022 World Championship qualifying, for the 2022-23 and 2023-24 seasons.

Playing style
Despite being most renowned as an intelligent tactician, he is a heavy scorer as well when amongst the balls at close quarters. This relatively cautious approach has led to the nickname "Crafty Ken".

Doherty has played his entire career with a warped cue randomly selected from the cue rack in Jason's, a club where he practised. He humorously revealed that the club manager originally wanted £5 for it, but Doherty haggled him down to £2. In his words, "It's warped. I must be one of the few professionals playing with a warped cue, but I wouldn't dream of changing it. I have got used to holding it in a certain way, with my eye trained on a piece of grain.

Media work
Doherty works on TV coverage of snooker matches with the BBC snooker coverage team. He became a regular commentator for the BBC starting with the 2009 Masters, following the side-lining of veteran expert Clive Everton. During the COVID-19 pandemic, he began working on ITV’s snooker coverage.

Doherty guested as a presenter on the Morning Show on East Coast FM. He presents a sports programme on Sunshine 106.8FM on Saturday mornings.

Personal life
Doherty resided in Rathgar, Dublin, and was married from 2001 to Sarah, with whom he has a son named Christian, born in 2007. In 2022 Doherty revealed that he and his wife have separated, and that these days he is based in England.

Doherty was nearly blinded in 2002 in a bathroom accident; after slipping, he struck an ornament, which narrowly missed his left eye. However, the distinctive scar on his right cheek dates back to his seventh birthday, when he fell off a shed roof on to a metal dustbin.

In May 2007, Doherty appeared on RTÉ's spoof show Anonymous, heavily disguised as a priest. Ostensibly he was a beginner at snooker and received some tips from Alex Higgins, who was initially fooled by the make-up and Doherty's hopeless play. However, as "Fr Donoghue" began to clear the table, Higgins' suspicions were aroused and Doherty was eventually rumbled. Doherty's disguise was enough to fool his mother and wife.

Doherty has been a WPBSA player director since 2012.

Performance and rankings timeline

Career finals

Ranking finals: 17 (6 titles)

Minor-ranking finals: 1

Non-ranking finals: 32 (18 titles)

Team finals: 2

Pro-am finals: 14 (7 titles)

Amateur finals: 7 (6 titles)

References

Further reading

External links

Ken Doherty at worldsnooker.com

Profile at Global Snooker

1969 births
Living people
Irish snooker players
Sportspeople from County Dublin
RTÉ Sports Person of the Year winners
Winners of the professional snooker world championship
People from Ranelagh
Snooker writers and broadcasters